Andrew Lee Todd Sr. (July 27, 1872 – March 24, 1945) was an American lawyer, educator and Democratic member of the Tennessee General Assembly.

Early life
Todd was born in the Rucker community of Rutherford County, Tennessee to a local farmer, Aaron Wilson Todd, on July 27, 1872. He married his wife, Minneola Wilson, on July 3, 1895. They had two sons: Andrew L. Todd Jr. (1904-1975), who would become mayor of Murfreesboro, and Aaron W. Todd (1902-1923); and a daughter, Evelyn Todd Bean (1898-1984).

He graduated from Union University (formerly Southwestern Baptist University) in Jackson, Tennessee and taught in public schools for several years before enrolling at the University of the South to study law.

Career
He was elected as Rutherford County Superintendent of Schools from 1900 to 1907 and Governor Frazier appointed him to the State Board of Education in 1905 where he continued to serve until 1915. As a member of the Board of Education he lobbied to locate the state's new teacher's college to Murfreesboro. The "Middle Tennessee State Teachers College" evolved into the present day Middle Tennessee State University.

From 1913 to 1923, Todd served in the Tennessee General Assembly, two terms in the House and two terms in the Senate.  As Speaker of the Senate in the 61st General Assembly, and Speaker of the House in the 62nd General Assembly, he is the only person in Tennessee history to have served in both capacities.

Apart from his political career, Todd was also an active businessman. He established the  "Toddington Farms" which specialized in pure-bred Aberdeen-Angus cattle and served as president of the "Murfreesboro Bank & Trust Co." from 1913 to 1929. He also bought two local news papers and merged them into The Daily News Journal.

Legacy
Todd is sometimes referred to as the "godfather" of Middle Tennessee State University and he continued to support the school until his death. In 1958, a new  library was constructed at a cost of $450,000. It was named the Andrew L Todd Library in his honor.

During the late 1930s, Todd was involved with the construction of a dam across "Black Fox Camp Spring Creek", the resulting reservoir is now known as "Todd's Lake."

References

School board members in Tennessee
Tennessee state senators
Lieutenant Governors of Tennessee
Members of the Tennessee House of Representatives
Speakers of the Tennessee House of Representatives
People from Murfreesboro, Tennessee
1872 births
1945 deaths
Businesspeople from Tennessee
Editors of Tennessee newspapers
Union University alumni
Middle Tennessee State University
20th-century American politicians